Anna Cabrera Ximénez (1460–1526) was an Italian ruler.  She was the ruling Countess of Modica between 1477 and 1526.

She married in 1480 to Fadrique Enríquez de Velasco, 4th Admiral of Castile (c. 1465–1538). They had no children.

References 

1477 births
1526 deaths
15th-century women rulers
16th-century women rulers
16th-century Italian nobility